Ahatlar is a village in the Amasra District, Bartın Province, Turkey. Its population is 318 (2021).

History 
The name of the village is mentioned as Ahatköy in the records of 1907.

Geography 
The village is 19 km from Bartın city center and 4 km from Amasra town centre.

References

Villages in Amasra District